Whyte's francolin (Scleroptila whytei) is a species of bird in the family Phasianidae.  It is found in grassy woodlands and grasslands in Democratic Republic of the Congo, Malawi, and Zambia.

References

Scleroptila
Birds of Sub-Saharan Africa
Birds described in 1908